My Friend Ganesha 3 is a 2010 Indian animated film under the banner of BaBa Arts Limited production and which released on 26 March 2010. It's a sequel to the 2009 film My Friend Ganesha 2.

Cast
 Rahul Pendkalkar as Ganesh 'Ganya' Twins brother Ashu
 Baba Sehgal as Shamshir Mann
 Eva Grover as Gangu S. Mann
 Sayaji Shinde as Nageshwar 'Naag'
 Himani Shivpuri as Chandramukhi
 Makarand Anaspure as Bala

References

External links
 

2010 films
2010s Hindi-language films
Indian films with live action and animation
Indian children's films
Indian animated films
Hindu mythology in popular culture
Ganesha in popular culture
Indian sequel films
Indian mythology in popular culture